Fletcher's Canal was a  long canal in Greater Manchester, which connected the Wet Earth Colliery to the Manchester, Bolton & Bury Canal at Clifton Aqueduct. The canal is now derelict and no longer used.

The canal was built on the south bank of the River Irwell through the area now known as Clifton Country Park. West of Pilkington's long sections of the canal are evident, although none of these sections hold water. As the canal passes through Clifton Country Park a footpath is maintained along the former towpath. Some of the original features are still evident, albeit in extremely poor condition.

History
Between 1752 and 1756, James Brindley devised a method of pumping water from the nearby Wet Earth Colliery using power harnessed from the River Irwell via a water wheel.

Around 1790-91 Matthew Fletcher began widening some of the original Brindley water channels to create a new canal, latterly known as Fletcher's Canal. In 1799 Benjamin Outram installed a lock  along the canal, to avoid taking too much water. The canal construction was completed and navigable by 1800.

In 1867 the original Brindley water wheel was decommissioned and replaced with a water turbine. This was replaced by a steam pump in 1924. Wet Earth Colliery was closed in 1928, and in 1952 the canal was closed and abandoned.

See also

Canals of Great Britain
History of the British canal system
Wet Earth Colliery
Pilkington Lancastrian Pottery

References

Bibliography

External links

Images of Fletcher's Canal
Manchester Bolton and Bury canal society
Pennine Waterways - Manchester Bolton and Bury Canal
Manchester Bury and Bolton canal non-official website
Waterway recovery group website
Dave Lane home page, includes information about Fletcher's Canal

Canals in Salford
Irwell Valley
Canals opened in 1800